Han Xinyun was the defending champion, but lost in the quarterfinals to Jamie Loeb.

Loeb won the title, defeating Tamara Zidanšek in the final, 7–6(7–4), 6–3.

Seeds

Main draw

Finals

Top half

Bottom half

References 
 Main draw

Launceston Tennis International - Singles